The Golani family were a royal family in Sindh, a province of Pakistan, dating from the 19th century.

After the invasion of Sindh by Charles Napier in 1843, the region was divided into many provinces and each of these provinces were assigned to Zamindars to collect taxes for the British East India Company. These Zamindars were also known as 'Wadaras'. Wadara of Shikarpur was Lord Wadra Golani (1861–1931), a merchant born in the royal family of Golani. In 1918 his eldest son Shobraj Golani (1885–1978) took over as the Landlord of Shikarpur, Digri, Jamrao, Kachhelo, Tando Jan Mohammed, Ratnabad, Roshanabad and Khayrpur. Shobraj Bhagwandas Golani was also invited to Great Britain by the King along with all the Nawabs and Maharajahs of India to discuss the participation of their respective provinces in an expansion of the British Empire in the Middle East. Sindh was later made part of Bombay Presidency and became a separate province in 1935. Shobraj along with his eldest son Shri Hashmatrai S Golani (1918–1979) moved to Bombay in 1947 after the Partition of India.

The Family Tree Starts with Golumal from which the surname Golani Started. Jawaharlal was elder son of Golumal and Lekhraj was Elder son of Jawaharmal. The Famous Seth Kushaldas Lekhraj Golani was the son of Lekhraj. Seth Kushal Das had 5 Sons Pribhdas, Gurnomal, Vishindas, Sobhraj, and Tejumal. The Picture below states the Division of Property of Seth Kushal Das amongst his 5 sons

Seth Kushaldas and his son Pribhdas had received many Afrin Namas from the British Government. Both of them were granted chairs in the Darbar of the Commissioner in Sind and Collector of Nawabshah. The following is the list of Afrinama

 His Excellency the Governor of Bombay had presented an Afrin Nama to Seth Kushaldas for good service rendered by him to all departments and particularly in connection with the new Nanlakhi cut.

 On 25 January 1923 by Collector of Nawabshah gave Afrin Nama to Seth Kushaldas of Taluka Kandiaro in recognition of meritorious service performed by him in giving assistance in repairs to canals

 Letter of Acknowledgment accompanied by a lungi was given to Seth Kushaldas as evidence of his good service by Robert Giles Commissioner in Sind on 19 January 1899 and 27 July 1902.

 On 25 January 1919 Collector of Nawabshah gave Afrin Nama to Seth Kushaldas Lekhraj Golani in Connection with Second Indian War Loan.

 One of the certificates showing Seth Priphdas Kushaldas Golani granted the privilege of a Chair in the Darbar of the Commissioner in Sind Walter Frank Hudson. This Certificate is signed by Walter Frank Hudson on 13 July 1927

Above is Photograph of Seth Pribhdas Kushaldas Golani

The list of such Afrin Namas is endless and original copies are still available with the family members. The family left all its wealth and abandoned its palaces to move to Bombay (Mumbai), Delhi and Baroda (Vadodara) after the Partition of India and Pakistan. In 1950 the Monarchy system was abolished in India. 

Members of this family are spread throughout the world. It has famous names like Lekhraj Golani, Khusaldas Golani, Bhagwandas Golani, Hashmatrai Golani, Harkishandas Golani, Jivanlal H. Golani, Rajiv J. Golani. Ravin R. Golani, Suryakant B. Golani, Rajender Golani, Ashok Golani, Vivek Golani, Jaiyu Golani, Anup Golani, Mamta Golani, Sanjiv Golani, Gaurav Golani, Kshitij Golani, Dinesh Golani and Kushaldas Golani. The Turban of Kushaldas Golani is still famous among Sindhis.

References
 The Sindh Story- by K.R. Malkani
 Sindh And The Races That Inhabit The Valley Of The Indus - by Richard Burton

External links
 Sindh Development Institute
 Government of Sindh website: Early history of Sindh

History of Sindh